Waldir Guerra (born April 2, 1967) is a retired Salvadoran footballer who played for the El Salvador national football team during his career.

Club career
Guerra arrived in the USA as a refugee in 1982 and attended Bells High School for whom he scored 117 goals in his first three years, which was a record. As a senior, he played for American Professional Soccer League side Los Angeles Heat until they went out of business in 1990. Three years later he played for Los Angeles Salsa for whom he scored once in 22 matches in his first season.

He returned to his native El Salvador in 1997 to play for Águila. He topped the goalscoring charts of the 1999 Apertura.

International career
Guerra made his debut for El Salvador in an April 1997 friendly match against Guatemala in which he immediately scored a goal, and has earned a total of 13 caps, scoring 3 goals. He has represented his country in 2 FIFA World Cup qualification matches and played at the 1997 and 1999 UNCAF Nations Cups as well as at the 1998 CONCACAF Gold Cup.

His final international game was a March 1999 UNCAF Nations Cup match against Guatemala.

International goals
Scores and results list El Salvador's goal tally first.

References

External links

1967 births
Living people
People from San Vicente, El Salvador
Association football forwards
Salvadoran footballers
El Salvador international footballers
1998 CONCACAF Gold Cup players
Los Angeles Heat players
Los Angeles Salsa players
C.D. Águila footballers
American Professional Soccer League players
Salvadoran expatriate footballers
Expatriate soccer players in the United States
Salvadoran expatriate sportspeople in the United States